Emergence is a professional wrestling event held by Impact Wrestling. The first event was held in 2020.

Events

Notes

References

External links 
Impact Wrestling

Impact Wrestling pay-per-view events